Thomas King (14 February 1833 – 20 November 1886) was a politician in colonial South Australia, Minister of Education from 1878 to 1881.

King was born at Stony Stratford, Buckinghamshire, England on 14 February 1833. He was the son of William King who migrated to Adelaide in 1852. He was for many years a member of the firm of Barrow & King, proprietors of the South Australian Advertiser, Chronicle, and Express. King represented Sturt in the South Australian House of Assembly from 10 April 1876 to 7 April 1881, and from 13 November 1882 to 6 July 1885, and was Minister of Education in the William Morgan Ministry from 7 October 1878 to 10 March 1881.

Having come to England as one of the South Australian commissioners to the Colonial and Indian Exhibition held at South Kensington in 1886, he died at Bayswater, England, on 20 November of that year.

See also
Hundred of King

References

1833 births
1886 deaths
Members of the South Australian House of Assembly
Politicians from Adelaide
19th-century Australian politicians